is a retired Japanese women's professional shogi player who achieved the rank of 1-dan.

Women's professional shogi
On April 1, 2022, the Japan Shogi Association announced that Ajiki had met the criteria for mandatory retirement but that the effective date of her retirement had yet to be determined. The  announced the following day that her retirement became official after this loss.

Promotion history
Ajiki's promotion history was as follows:
1998, April 1: 2-kyū
2002, April 1: 1-kyū
2003, April 1: 1-dan
2022, July 11: Retired

Note: All ranks are women's professional ranks.

References

External links
 ShogiHub: Ajiki, Fusako

Japanese shogi players
Living people
Women's professional shogi players
Professional shogi players from Tokyo
Retired women's professional shogi players
1974 births
People from Musashino, Tokyo